Lew Pollack (June 16, 1895 – January 18, 1946) was an American song composer and musician active during the 1920s and the 1930s.

Career
Pollack was born in New York City where he went to DeWitt Clinton High School and was active as a boy soprano in a choral group headed by Walter Damrosch.

Starting out as a singer and pianist in vaudeville acts he began writing theme music for silent films before collaborating with others on popular songs. In 1914, he wrote "That's a Plenty", a rag that became an enduring Dixieland standard.

Among his best-known songs are "Charmaine" and "Diane" with Ernö Rapée, "Miss Annabelle Lee", "My Yiddishe Momme" with Jack Yellen, made famous by Sophie Tucker,  "Two Cigarettes in the Dark", "Alone with You" (from Rebecca of Sunnybrook Farm), "At the Codfish Ball" (featured in the Shirley Temple movie "Captain January" with Buddy Ebsen, and later the title of a Mad Men television episode), and Go In and Out The Window, now a children's music standard.  He also collaborated with Paul Francis Webster, Sidney Clare, Sidney Mitchell, and Ned Washington amongst others.  He died of a heart attack in Hollywood at age 50.

Recognition
Lew Pollack was elected to the Songwriters Hall of Fame in 1970.

References

External links
Lew Pollack's entry at the Songwriters' Hall of Fame

 Lew Pollack recordings at the Discography of American Historical Recordings.

1895 births
1946 deaths
20th-century American composers
20th-century American musicians
Jewish American composers
Jewish American songwriters
Musicians from New York City
Songwriters from New York (state)
20th-century American Jews